Seebad Utoquai is a public bath in the Swiss municipality of Zürich, being part of the historical Seeuferanlage promenades that were built between 1881 and 1887.

Geography 
The bath is situated at Utoquai respectively in the Seefeld quarter at the Zürichsee lake shore on the right bank. Public transport is provided by the VBZ transport company by the tram lines 2 and 4, bus lines 33 and postauto bus lines 912 and 916 to Chinagarten Zürich stop.  It is situated opposite of Strandbad Mythenquai on the other bank of the lower Zürichsee lake shore in Zürich.

History and description 

As the old bathhouse had to make place for the construction of quais, the then independent municipality of Riesbach built two new bathing facilities Strandbad Tiefenbrunnen (1886) and Seebad Utoquai (1890). For the latter, a bathing palace on stilts with delicate, tower-like structures in the Moorish style was implented. For the first time in Zürich, it was allowed to men and women to bathe in the same bath. In 1942 the towering domes were added by sun terraces, also in a wooden construction, were built, and the basic structure of the original bathroom is still preserved. The Utoquai figures in Inventar der schützenswerten Gärten und Anlagen von kommunaler Bedeutung, being the inventory of estimable gardens and grounds of local importance that was established in 1989.

Cultural heritage 
The structure is listed in the Swiss inventory of cultural property of national and regional significance as an object of regional importance.

See also 
 Utoquai
 Quaianlagen

References

External links 

  

1890 establishments in Switzerland
District 8 of Zürich
Public baths in Switzerland
Buildings and structures in Zürich
History of Zürich
Culture of Zürich
Buildings and structures completed in 1890
Cultural property of regional significance in Switzerland
19th-century architecture in Switzerland